Gísli Rúnar Jónsson (20 March 1953 – 28 July 2020) was an Icelandic comedian, actor, voice actor, talkshow host, screenwriter, producer, director and a family man

Early years 
Gísli was born in Reykjavík, Iceland in 1953 to parents Guðrún Valgerður Gísladóttir, a housewife and Jón Konráð Björnsson, a local business man. Gísli has three siblings.

Career 
Gísli is mostly known for his involvement with Icelandic comedies and sitcoms in the 1980s. He wrote and directed the sitcoms Heilsubælið í Gerfahverfi and Fastir liðir eins og Venjulega, which become hugely successful in Iceland and have been played on reruns every few years for the last 30 years.

In 1996 Gísli hosted his own talk show called Gott Kvöld með Gísla Rúnari (English: Good Evening with Gísli Rúnar) on Stöð 2.

In addition to starring in numerous plays Gísli is also a vivid screenwriter and translator of foreign plays into Icelandic. To name a few of his translations are Little Shop of Horrors, Grease and Mary Poppins.

In 2001 Gísli wrote the biography of singer Björgvin Halldórsson. In 2011 he published the book Ég drepst þar sem mér sýnist (English: I'll die wherever I feel like), a book filled with funny stories from his early days as a comedian.

Personal life 
Gísli was married to actress Edda Björgvinsdóttir. They met in Drama school in the 1970s and got divorced in 2000. They remain close friends. They have two sons, who like their parents both took to acting, Björgvin Franz Gíslason and Róbert Ólíver Gíslason. He has two other children from other relationships.

His son Róbert was diagnosed with Tourette syndrome as a child. Both Gísli himself and his older son Björgvin are thought to have the disease although never diagnosed by a professional.

Gísli was an alcoholic and stopped drinking in 1987.

References

External links 
 
 Glatkistan

1953 births
2020 deaths
Gisli Runar Jonsson
Gisli Runar Jonsson
Gisli Runar Jonsson
Gisli Runar Jonsson
Gisli Runar Jonsson
Gisli Runar Jonsson
Gisli Runar Jonsson
Gisli Runar Jonsson
Gisli Runar Jonsson
People with Tourette syndrome